= Jo Coghlan =

Australian researcher, sociologist, and pop culturalist

Academic background
- Education: PhD

Academic work
- Discipline: Popular culture studies; media and cultural studies; material culture; fashion studies
- Institutions: University of New England (UNE)
- Notable works: The British Royals in Popular Culture (2025); The Barbie Phenomenon (2025)

Jo Coghlan is an Australian academic whose research focuses on popular culture and material culture, including film and television, political representations of women, fashion studies, and death studies. She is an associate professor in Social and Philosophical Inquiry at the University of New England (UNE).

== Academic career ==
Coghlan is an associate professor in Social and Philosophical Inquiry at the University of New England. The UNE Popular Culture Research Network describes her as one of its founding members and notes her work connected to popular culture research activities at UNE.

== Research ==
Coghlan's research interests include popular culture and material culture, with an emphasis on food, royalty, film and television, political representations of women, fashion studies, and death studies.

== Professional service ==
Coghlan is part of the editorial team for the Australasian Journal of Popular Culture.

== Selected works ==
=== Books and edited volumes ===
- Nolan, Huw, and Jo Coghlan. Landscapes That Speak: Terrain, Threshold, and Transformation Across Cinema and Culture. Palgrave Macmillan, 2026.
- Nolan, Huw, and Jo Coghlan. Breaking Television: How Breaking Bad Redefined Morality, Genre, and the Antihero (TV Matters). Routledge, 2026.
- Piatti-Farnell, L., Lisa Hackett, Jo Coghlan, and Huw Nolan (eds). Representing Bridgerton: Intersectional Perspectives of the Popular Culture Phenomenon (Advances in Popular Culture). Routledge, 2026.
- Coghlan, Jo, and Lisa Hackett. Revealing History: How Swimsuits Shaped Popular Culture from Bloomers to Bikinis. Reaktion Books, 2026.
- Coghlan, Jo, Lisa Hackett, and Huw Nolan (eds). The Barbie Phenomenon. Vol. 1: Gender, Identity, Race and Sexuality. Routledge, 2025. ISBN 978-1-03611-530-0 (hbk); ISBN 978-1-03262-276-2 (pbk); ISBN 978-1-003-61153-0 (ebk).
- Coghlan, Jo, Lisa Hackett, and Huw Nolan (eds). The Barbie Phenomenon. Vol. 2: Icon, Brand, Celebrity and Fandom. Routledge, 2025. ISBN 978-1-041-00760-9.
- Coghlan, Jo, Lisa Hackett, and Huw Nolan. The British Royals in Popular Culture: From the Tudors to the Windsors (Advances in Popular Culture). Routledge, 2025. ISBN 978-1-032-73041-7.

=== Journal articles ===
- Coghlan, Jo, Erin K. Burrell, and Zakaia Cvitanovich. “Styling Strength: Rugby Barbies and the Discipline of Plastic Femininity.” Fashion, Style & Popular Culture, September 30, 2026, 1–18. https://doi.org/10.1386/fspc_00411_1.
- Coghlan, Jo, Lisa Hackett, and Huw Nolan. "Adaptations, Reboots and Remakes in Popular Culture: Crime, Noir, Horror, Heroes, Beasts and Bodies.” Australasian Journal of Popular Culture, vol. 13, no. 2, 2024, pp. 119–124. doi:10.1386/ajpc_00092_2.
- Nolan, Huw, Jo Coghlan, and Lisa Hackett. "Ethics and Post-Evolution: The Role of Hyperreal Adaptations in Shaping Popular Culture Perceptions of Animals.” Australasian Journal of Popular Culture, vol. 13, no. 2, 2024, pp. 177–195. doi:10.1386/ajpc_00097_1.
- Coghlan, Jo, Lisa Hackett, and Huw Nolan. "Barbie: Imagining and Interrogating a Popular Culture Icon.” M/C Journal, vol. 27, no. 3, 2024. doi:10.5204/mcj.3072.
- Hackett, Lisa, and Jo Coghlan. "Swimsuits as Uniforms: Bodily Transformations, Control and Transgression.” Clothing Cultures, vol. 10, no. 1, 2024, pp. 21–37. doi:10.1386/cc_00066_1.
- Coghlan, Jo, and Lisa Hackett. "The World Is Not Enough: The Impact of James Bond on Popular Culture.” International Journal of James Bond Studies, vol. 6, no. 1, 2023.
- Coghlan, Jo, and Lisa Hackett. "Parliamentary Dress: Contesting the Political Uniform.” M/C Journal, vol. 26, no. 1, 2023. doi:10.5204/mcj.2963.
- Hackett, Lisa J., and Jo Coghlan. "The Mad Kings of The Royals: Fashioning Transgressions in Royal Popular Culture Television." Film, Fashion and Consumption, vol. 11, no. 2, 2022, pp. 139–153. doi:10.1386/ffc_00044_1.
